The Brecon VHF FM transmitting station in Powys, Wales was originally built by the BBC in 1965 as a relay for VHF FM radio. It consists of a pair of 15 m wooden telegraph poles - one carrying the transmitting antennas, and the other carrying receiving aerials pointed at Wenvoe transmitting station near Cardiff. These stand on land at Pencrug Farm, about 244 m above sea level.

The station does not radiate television, and never did. TV for the area comes from a different site at Brecon transmitting station a few km to the east.

Channels listed by frequency

FM Radio

20 December 1965 - January 1977
As built, the transmitter re-radiated Wenvoe's three original FM transmissions with horizontal polarisation and with a radiation pattern favouring the town of Brecon.

January 1977 - 1989
The launch of Radio Cymru saw the replacement across Wales of the English-language Radio 4 Wales service.

1989 - present
Bandplan changes allowed more frequencies in Band II, Radio 1 gained its own frequency and National Radio 4 could be transmitted. About this time, the transmitting aerials were changed to the present configuration, radiating a slant-polarisation signal in a fairly omnidirectional pattern using a Lindenblad Array

References

External links
The FM radio transmitter for Brecon
UKFree's listing for the Brecon FM transmitter

Transmitter sites in Wales